William or Willie Robb may refer to:

Bill Robb (1927–2012), Australian politician
William Robb (footballer, born 1895) (1895–1976), Scottish footballer
William Robb (footballer, born 1927) (1927–2002), Scottish footballer
William Robb (British Army officer), British Army officer